Khas Kola (also Romanized as Khāş Kolā and Khāşekolā) is a village in dasht sar sofla, in the Central District of Amol County, Mazandaran Province, Iran. At the 2011 census, its population was 515, in 149 families.

References 

Populated places in Amol County